The 1991 Indian general election were held to elect 20 members to the tenth Lok Sabha from Kerala. Indian National Congress (INC)-led United Democratic Front (UDF) won 16 seats while Left Democratic Front (LDF), led by Communist Party of India (Marxist) (CPI(M)) won the remaining 4 seats. Turnout for the election was at 70.66% In the Lok Sabha, INC formed a minority government under the premiership of P. V. Narasimha Rao.

Alliances and parties 

UDF is a Kerala legislative alliance formed by INC veteran K. Karunakaran. LDF comprises primarily of CPI(M) and the CPI, forming the Left Front in the national level. Bharatiya Janata Party (BJP) contested in 19 seats.

United Democratic Front

Left Democratic Front

Bharatiya Janata Party

List of elected MPs

Results

Performance of political parties

By constituency

See also 

 Elections in Kerala
 Politics of Kerala

References 

1991 Indian general election
Indian general elections in Kerala